The showboat Goldenrod was designated  U.S. National Historic Landmark on 24 December 1967. She was placed on the 'Threatened Historical Landmarks' list in 2001.

One of two remaining examples of the modern era of showboats that ended in the 1920s, Goldenrod is the largest and most elaborately decorated of the showboats. She provided entertainment in the form of minstrel shows, vaudeville, and serious drama. The boat is designed in the manner of a 19th-century showboat rather than a late 20th century one, in other words, not like a paddlewheeler steamboat.  In October 2017, the boat burned to its hull and was presumed a total loss.

History

Goldenrod was built in 1909 by Pope Dock Company of Parkersburg, West Virginia for W.R. Markle at a cost $75,000.

In 1910, twenty-one showboats, plied the Mississippi, visiting 15 mid-western states.  (Showboats were typically non-powered barges with entertainment palaces built upon them.) By 1928, this number had dwindled to eleven, and by 1938, only five remained in operation.  Between the Great Depression, movies, and increased mobility, the days of the showboat were all but over.

Goldenrod was the last showboat to work the Mississippi. Under the ownership of Capt. Bill Menke, she was moored at the St. Louis riverfront in 1937.  By 1950, she had been partially sunk and salvaged twice. Shows were still being staged, and, for 75 cents a head, St. Louis playgoers could board the boat and "sass the actors"  on stage.

On 1 June 1962, a disastrous fire, caused by an electrical short, all but destroyed the superstructure of the auditorium, and caused severe damage to the entire structure. The Goldenrod was then purchased by a group of St. Louis businessmen headed by Frank C. Pierson and Don Franz, and restored to her original glory, and beyond. Plush carpeting was laid in the auditorium, with cabaret seating, under a huge crystal chandelier. Many antique appointments were salvaged from old St. Louis mansions being torn down. Brass fixtures and rails were restored or replaced, as was the tin ceiling and elaborate woodwork. A cocktail lounge was added, with a small bandstand where the St. Louis Ragtimers band played traditional ragtime for many years. The upstairs staterooms were converted into a buffet dining room. When this $300,000 renovation was completed, Goldenrod had her Grand Re-Opening in May, 1965. In 1967, she was registered as a National Historic Landmark. Mr. Pierson also owned the Becky Thatcher, a former packet boat, traveling no more but moored beside Goldenrod, featuring a restaurant, lounges, and gift shop.

On the levee
Beginning in the early 1960s to about 1985, the National Ragtime Festival at St. Louis was held in June aboard Goldenrod. Many vintage jazz and ragtime bands were featured, including Turk Murphy and The Salty Dogs. From 1975 to 1984, Goldenrod was operated as a sister theater to the Heritage Square Opera House in Golden, Colorado, presenting a unique style of melodrama plus vaudeville olio, in a high energy format created by G. William Oakley of Denver, Colorado. During this same period, the National Ragtime Festivals, produced by Oakley, became an annual phenomenon on the St. Louis riverfront.

St. Charles
In 1989, Goldenrod was purchased by the city of St. Charles for $300,000 and moved to the historic Missouri River town. She was restored and renovated, costing the city about 3.5 million dollars over the next 12 years. The dinner theater continued to operate as a popular attraction.  In 2001, she was run aground after Missouri River levels ran low. Goldenrod was closed due to Coast Guard structural repair requirements.  The repair estimates were much higher than expected, and the City Council decided to sell her in 2002.

Sale
When no one offered to buy her, the council decided to give her away. Four groups submitted proposals, and the council chose Lewis and Clark Landing, a firm headed by John Schwarz. Goldenrod was moved to storage near the Poplar Street Bridge in downtown St. Louis.  Later she was moved to Kampsville, Illinois, where she is currently (as of July 2011) moored on the Illinois River.

Schwarz' original intention was to place her in a protective basin to be constructed near her mooring location, but the plan never happened. Goldenrod was, instead, towed to a mooring spot next to the tugboat America, which was owned by Shelia Prokuski and Randy Newingham.

Uncertain future
In 2006, a civil suit was filed against Schwarz in an attempt to collect $24,000 in mooring fees owed to Prokuski.  The case was supposed to have been settled, with Schwarz retaining ownership of Goldenrod while he found new mooring for the boat.  Schwarz did not move the boat, and she was sold at a sheriff's auction in October 2007.  Since there were no other bids on her, Prokuski bought her for $5,000.

As of 15 January 2008, the showboat's future was still uncertain.  She remains moored in Calhoun County and mired in court as questions remain about the legality of the sale. The judge, Richard Greenleaf, said the proper paperwork had not been filed for the auction, so he has not signed off on the sale.

The couple want to sell Goldenrod but have to wait until the title clears. Though it has been reported they will sell the historic boat for scrap, Newingham has denied this.

Since 2010, Goldenrod has been under the care of Steve Debellis, Jacob Medford and the Historic Riverboat Preservation Association.

In 2015 the hull buckled when the vessel ended up on uneven land after river levels dropped suddenly while it was being moved to the riverbank. With insufficient funds to save the ship, the Historic Riverboat Preservation Association decided to save the pilothouse and as much of the interior furnishings as possible for incorporation into museum displays. Work on removing interior furnishings proceeded on Saturdays and Sundays from that point until 31 March 2016. On 1 April 2016, the vessel was given to the owners of the dock where she was moored. While the vessel's fate rests with dock owners, Jacob Medford believes the vessel will end up as scrap.

Goldenrod was destroyed by fire in late 2017.

Famous entertainers

Several notable entertainers have performed on Goldenrod, including Red Skelton, Pearl Bailey, Cab Calloway and Bob Hope.

Goldenrod served as an inspiration for Edna Ferber's novel Show Boat.

See also
List of National Historic Landmarks in Missouri
List of National Historic Landmarks in Illinois

References

External links

The Goldenrod Showboat A Short History

1909 ships
Floating theatres
Landmarks of St. Louis
National Historic Landmarks in Illinois
Ships on the National Register of Historic Places in Illinois
National Register of Historic Places in Calhoun County, Illinois